Flavio Francisco Maestri Andrade (born 21 January 1973 in Lima) is a Peruvian retired football player.

He is nicknamed The Tank because of his large size. Throughout his career, he has played professional football for numerous teams in Peru, Spain, Mexico, Brazil, China, Chile and has also played for the National team.

Club career
When Flavio Maestri was 10 years old, his father, Edmondo Maestri Baroni, brought him to Sporting Cristal to try out. The youth coach at the time, Alberto Gallardo, admitted him into the club. When Flavio was 16, he signed his first professional contract with Sporting Cristal. At age 18 he debuted with the first team under coach Juan Carlos Oblitas in a match against San Agustin. He scored his first goal that same year in a match against Hijos de Yurimaguas.

Flavio Maestri was part of the team consisting of Roberto Palacios, Nolberto Solano, Julinho, Jorge Soto, Pedro Garay and Julio César Balerio that won the "Tricampeonato" from 1994 to 1996. By age 23, Flavio became an idol for Cristal fans and became an integral member of the team by scoring more than 100 goals.

His good performances caught the attention of Hércules CF and in 1996 he transferred there. He played in Spain until 1998 when Chilean club Universidad de Chile acquired him. Flavio played with Chilean club until 2001.

In 2002, Maestri came back to Sporting Cristal after six years outside of Peru. He was loaned out to San Luis F.C. but came back to Sporting Cristal to win another championship, the Torneo Apertura 2003. Flavio was than loaned out again, this time to Brazilian club Vitória.

Flavio returned to Peru and did not renew his contract with Sporting Cristal. Alianza Lima signed him and Flavio became part of their team in 2004. In 2005 again Maestri went abroad, to Chinese club Shanghai The 9 on loan. After his loan in China he returned to Alianza Lima where he became National Champions in 2006. At the end of 2007, Alianza Lima did not renew their contract with Maestri. Flavio decided to sign with Sport Boys but due to injury he did not play often.

In 2009, he returned once again to Sporting Cristal.

International career
Maestri has made 57 appearances for the Peru national football team, 24 of those in FIFA World Cup qualification matches.

He is also responsible for Peru winning the only important title for the team during the last decade which was the 1999 Kirin Cup, where they shared first place with Belgium. Maestri scored the only goal on the sixth minute against Belgium which later ended in a tie.

Managerial career
Maestri was named manager at Coronel Bolognesi in June 2014.

Honours

Club
Sporting Cristal
 Primera División Peruana (4): 1994, 1995, 1996, 2003 Clausura

Universidad de Chile
 Primera División de Chile (2): 1999, 2000
 Copa Chile (2): 1998, 2000

Alianza Lima
Primera División Peruana (3): 2004, 2006 Apertura, 2006 Descentralizado

Individual honours

References

External links 
 

1973 births
Living people
Footballers from Lima
Peruvian people of Italian descent
Association football forwards
Peruvian footballers
Peru international footballers
Sporting Cristal footballers
Hércules CF players
Universidad de Chile footballers
San Luis F.C. players
Esporte Clube Vitória players
Club Alianza Lima footballers
Sport Boys footballers
Peruvian Primera División players
La Liga players
China League One players
Liga MX players
Chilean Primera División players
Peruvian expatriate footballers
Peruvian expatriate sportspeople in Chile
Peruvian expatriate sportspeople in China
Peruvian expatriate sportspeople in Mexico
Peruvian expatriate sportspeople in Brazil
Peruvian expatriate sportspeople in Spain
Expatriate footballers in Brazil
Expatriate footballers in Chile
Expatriate footballers in China
Expatriate footballers in Mexico
Expatriate footballers in Spain
1991 Copa América players
1993 Copa América players
1999 Copa América players
2000 CONCACAF Gold Cup players
2004 Copa América players
Peruvian football managers
Coronel Bolognesi managers